Frank Thiess (13 March 1890 – 22 December 1977) was a German writer.

Biography
Born in Eluisenstein (now Ogre Municipality), Kreis Riga, Governorate of Livonia, Russian Empire (now Latvia), Thiess grew up in Berlin. He worked as a journalist for four years until he was enlisted into the Germany army in World War I. Discharged after a few months because of a heart condition, he returned to Berlin and journalism. Within a few years, however. he decided to devote himself full-time to writing. His early novels were focussed on contemporary subjects — Time magazine once called him "the hot trumpet in Germany's jazz age." He married Florence Losey, an American singer. From the 1930s on, he concentrated on historical novels.

His 1936 novel, Tsushima, translated into English as The Voyage of Forgotten Men, recounted the epic journey of the Russian Second Pacific Squadron, under the command of Admiral Rozhestvensky, from the Baltic Sea to the Sea of Japan, and its defeat by the Japanese fleet at the Battle of Tsushima in 1905.

His two-part novel, Neapolitanische Legende and Caruso in Sorrent, was based on the life and career of the great Italian tenor, Enrico Caruso.

Thiess remained in Nazi Germany, but there is no evidence that he joined the Nazi Party. 

Thiess died 1977 in Darmstadt.

Bibliography
Novels:
Claudia (1913)
Der Tod von Falern (1921)
Angelika ten Swaart (1923)
Die Verdammten (English title: The Devil's Shadow; 1923)
Das Gesicht des Jahrhunderts, Briefe an Zeitgenossen (1923)
Der Leibheftige (English title: Design for Living; 1924)
Frauenraub (English title: Interlude; 1927 - revised as Katharina Winter, 1949)
Johanna und Esther (1933) (revised as Gäa (1957))
Tsushima (English title: The Voyage of Forgotten Men; 1936)
Das Reich der Dämonen (1941)
Neapolitanische Legende (English title: Neapolitan Legend; 1942)
Caruso in Sorrent (1946)
Die Strassen des Labyrinths (1951)
Die griechischen Kaiser (1959)
Gäa (1959)
Sturz nach oben (1961)

References

External links
 

1890 births
1977 deaths
People from Ikšķile Municipality
People from Kreis Riga
Baltic-German people
Emigrants from the Russian Empire to Germany
German male novelists
20th-century German novelists
20th-century German male writers
German Army personnel of World War I
Commanders Crosses of the Order of Merit of the Federal Republic of Germany
Recipients of the Grand Decoration for Services to the Republic of Austria